American pop rock band Hot Chelle Rae have released two studio albums, one extended play, seven singles and seven music videos. Their debut album Lovesick Electric was released in October 2009 through Jive Records and failed to chart. Its second single "Bleed" reached the top forty on Billboard'''s Pop Songs chart. The band achieved commercial success after the release of their 2011 studio album Whatever, which produced the international hits "Tonight Tonight" and "I Like It Like That".

The band released one EP, Masquerade'', under the name of Miracle Drug, but the album, a collection of demos, did not chart.

Albums

Extended plays

Singles

As lead artists

Other charted songs

B sides

As featured artist

Notes

Music videos 
 "I Like to Dance" (2009)
 "Bleed" (2010)
 "Tonight Tonight" (2011)
 "I Like It Like That" (2011)
 "Honestly" (2012)
 "Whatever" (2012)
 "Hung Up" (2013)
 "Recklessly" (2013)
 "Don't Say Goodnight" (2014)
 "I Hate LA" (2020)
 "Stay" (2020)
 "Too Much" (2020)
 "Come My Way (Acoustic) (2020)

References

Discographies of American artists